Dudley Township is a township in Haskell County, Kansas, USA.  As of the 2000 census, its population was 1,814.

Geography
According to the USGS, it contains two cemeteries: Canaan and Dudley.

Transportation
Dudley Township contains one airport or landing strip, Master Feeders Eleven Incorporated Airport.

References
 USGS Geographic Names Information System (GNIS)

External links
 US-Counties.com
 City-Data.com

Townships in Haskell County, Kansas
Townships in Kansas